Greigia landbeckii is a plant species in the genus Greigia. It is endemic to Chile. A synonym is Bromelia landbeckii. Its common name is ñocha, and was traditionally used in wickerwork.

References
Chilean Bromeliaceae: diversity, distribution and evaluation of conservation status (Published online: 10 March 2009)

landbeckii
Endemic flora of Chile